Paige Gebhardt Cognetti is an American politician serving as the 36th Mayor of Scranton, Pennsylvania. She is the first woman to be mayor of the city and won her seat in a special election. A member of the Democratic Party, she ran her first Scranton mayoral campaign as an Independent.

Early life
Cognetti was born in Eugene, Oregon. She graduated summa cum laude from the Robert D. Clark Honors College at the University of Oregon with a BA in English Literature and Romance Languages, and holds an MBA from the Harvard Business School. She started her career as an English teacher in Japan; and was a fundraiser for the Clinton and Obama 2008 campaigns and later served as an advisor at the U.S. Treasury Department.

Political career
Prior to Cognetti's run for Scranton mayor, she served as a director of the Scranton School Board as well as a special assistant to Pennsylvania's then state auditor, Eugene DePasquale. She has run on reform and pragmatism platforms: at the school board, she criticized Scranton's no-bid school bus contracts and unapproved payments to contractors. For her mayoral bid, she focused on investments and budgets for local businesses, education, and infrastructure.

Mayor of Scranton
In 2019, Cognetti ran in the Scranton mayoral special to finish the term of former Scranton mayor Bill Courtright, who pleaded guilty to corruption charges in July of that year. Cognetti, previously a life long Democrat, ran as an independent after she deemed the closed caucus system of nomination used by the local Democratic Party as not in favor of the people. Cognetti won the special election with 36% of the vote.

Cognetti ran for reelection to a full term in 2021 as a Democrat and won in a landslide.

Electoral history

References

External links 

University of Oregon alumni
Harvard Business School alumni
Obama administration personnel
Mayors of Scranton, Pennsylvania
Living people
Year of birth missing (living people)
Place of birth missing (living people)
Women mayors of places in Pennsylvania